Downtown Youngstown is the traditional center of the city of Youngstown, Ohio. After decades of precipitous decline, the downtown area shows signs of renewal. Civic leaders have expressed hope that the district will emerge as a significant arts and entertainment district within the Youngstown-Warren metropolitan area.

Downtown Youngstown is the site of most of the city's government buildings and banks. A number of entertainment venues are also located in the downtown, including the Covelli Centre, Powers Auditorium (the original Warner Bros. Theatre), the DeYor Performing Arts Center, and Oakland Centers for the Performing Arts. In addition, the downtown sits to the immediate south of notable cultural and educational resources, including Youngstown State University, the Butler Institute of American Art, and the McDonough Museum of Contemporary Art.

1970–2002 
Youngstown's traditional downtown area fell into steep decline in the 1970s and early 1980s.

Amid the departure of retail businesses along the main thoroughfare of West Federal Street, municipal officials made a decision to close the street to vehicle traffic in order to build a pedestrian-oriented shopping area.  By the mid-1980s, most of the downtown area's department stores and movie theaters had closed up. Meanwhile, the city's car dealerships relocated in the suburbs. By the early 1990s, the downtown had become a stark symbol of the community's economic decline.

2002–present 

In the early 2000s, municipal officials took steps to reverse Youngstown's economic difficulties. They presented a citywide redevelopment plan known as Youngstown 2010. One of the plan's primary goals was to facilitate the revival of the downtown area. One of the municipal government's first steps was to re-open West Federal Street to traffic, a project that was completed in early 2005.

While the city has been less successful in drawing large retail businesses back to the downtown, older buildings are being refurbished for smaller businesses, while others have been razed to make way for new buildings.  The downtown is currently the site of the Covelli Centre, which has given Youngstown a professional hockey team, and formerly an Arena Football League 2 franchise. At first the Covelli Centre was running at a loss, however it has been consistently profitable for several years as of 2016.

Economy of Downtown Youngstown 

Downtown's economy largely depends on companies whose offices are located in the area and the university.

Youngstown State University is the largest employer in the city, and the headquarters of Home Savings and Loan is also located downtown. Other companies with offices downtown include JPMorgan Chase, FNB Corporation, Huntington Bancshares, KeyBank, PNC Bank, InfoCision, and The Youngstown Business Incubator. The United States Postal Service has a large branch located in downtown that is a large employer.

The Youngstown Business Incubator houses several small, (B2B Software) technological  companies. The Incubator occupies one historic building. The incubator has been expanding as of 2016-2017, converting the old vindicator building.

The old Stambaugh building, which once housed the Youngstown Sheet and Tube headquarters has been renovated to a 4 star Double Tree by Hilton hotel, in 2018. In 2019, the Youngstown Foundation Amphitheater opened alongside a Riverfront park, and Huntington Community Alley.

External links
 Official website of the City of Youngstown
 Youngstown 2010- A citywide revitalization effort

Youngstown, Ohio
Neighborhoods in Youngstown, Ohio